Nikolaos Makris (1829–1911) was a Hellenic Army General and politician.

Nikolaos Makris was born in Missolonghi in 1829. He was the son of Dimitrios Makris, a military leader during the Greek War of Independence of 1821. He entered the Hellenic Army and was sent to France for training. After his return, he served in various command and staff positions, and eventually commanded the Athens police and became head of the Hellenic Gendarmerie.

He participated in the Greco-Turkish War of 1897 as commander of the 1st Infantry Division.

After the war, he left the army with the rank of Major General. He was elected MP for his native prefecture of Aetolia-Acarnania several times.

References

The first version of the article is translated from the article at the Greek Wikipedia (Main page)

1829 births
1911 deaths
Hellenic Army major generals
Greek politicians
People from Missolonghi
19th-century Greek military personnel
Greek military personnel of the Greco-Turkish War (1897)